José Eusebio Cóceres (born 14 August 1963) is an Argentine professional golfer who spent many years on the European Tour and the PGA Tour.

Cóceres was born in Argentina's Chaco province. He is one of 11 children who grew up in a two-bedroom house. He became a caddie and taught himself the game.

Cóceres turned professional in 1986 and won a place on the European Tour at the 1990 Qualifying School. After struggling in 1991 and 1992 he performed steadily on the tour from 1993 onwards, and in 2000 he reached a career high of thirteenth on the Order of Merit. His two European Tour wins came at the 1994 Heineken Open Catalonia and the 2000 Dubai Desert Classic.

In 2001, Cóceres switched to the PGA Tour. His first season in the U.S. was very inconsistent, with seven missed cuts and only two top ten finishes, but those top ten finishes were wins at the WorldCom Classic - The Heritage of Golf and the National Car Rental Golf Classic Disney. He was the first Argentine to win on the PGA Tour since Roberto De Vicenzo at the 1968 Houston Champions International. He broke his arm before the start of the 2002 season, and has struggled for form since. He has featured in the top 20 of the Official World Golf Rankings. Cóceres did not play on the PGA Tour from 2009 to 2013 due to an injured left wrist.

Cóceres has won several tournaments in his home country and elsewhere in South America. In 2002 he became the third golfer to receive Argentina's highest sports award, the Olimpia de Oro ("Golden Olympia").

Professional wins (21)

PGA Tour wins (2)

PGA Tour playoff record (1–2)

European Tour wins (2)

Tour de las Américas wins (1)

1Co-sanctioned by the TPG Tour

TPG Tour wins (2)

1Co-sanctioned by the Tour de las Américas

Other wins (13)
1988 (1) Los Lagartos Grand Prix (Argentina)
1989 (1) Pinamar Open (Argentina)
1992 (2) Montevideo Open (Uruguay), Los Cardales Challenge (Argentina)
1993 (2) Pinamar Open (Argentina), Los Cardales Challenge (Argentina)
1994 (2) Ituzaingo Grand Prix (Argentina), Mendoza Open (Argentina)
1995 (1) Tournament of Champions (Argentina)
2003 (1) Argentine PGA Championship
2004 (2) Argentine Open, Argentine PGA Championship
2007 (1) Campeonato Metropolitano (Argentina)

European Senior Tour wins (2)

Results in major championships

CUT = missed the half-way cut
"T" = tied

Summary

Most consecutive cuts made – 3 (2002 PGA – 2003 PGA)
Longest streak of top-10s – 1

Results in The Players Championship

WD = withdrew
"T" = Tied

Results in World Golf Championships

1Cancelled due to 9/11

QF, R16, R32, R64 = Round in which player lost in match play
"T" = Tied
NT = No tournament

Team appearances
Alfred Dunhill Cup (representing Argentina): 1993, 1995, 1997, 1998, 2000
World Cup (representing Argentina): 1989, 1997

References

External links

Argentine male golfers
European Tour golfers
PGA Tour golfers
PGA Tour Champions golfers
Sportspeople from Chaco Province
1963 births
Living people